Joan Giraud d'Astròs (in French language Jean-Géraud d'Astros ; Jandourdis, Gascony, 1594–1648) was an Occitan language writer and a Catholic priest.

His main work is the poem Lou Trimfe de la lenguo gascouo (Lo Trimfe de la lengua gascoa, edited in 1642).

External links
 Lo trinfe de la lengua gascoa on Gallica.fr
 L'escòla deu crestian idiòt from Toulouse Library

Occitan-language writers